Neil Small is professor of health research at the University of Bradford. He previously held posts at the University of Sheffield and the University of York. He is a fellow of the Academy of Social Sciences. His book Living and Dying with Dementia – Dialogues about Palliative Care won in the category Non-Clinical Medical Book at the Society of Authors and the Royal Society of Medicine Medical Book Awards 2008.

He is a member of the academic team of Born in Bradford and has recently been the co-author of a study of infant mortality in the London Borough of Redbridge which concluded that one in five such deaths were because the parents were related.

Selected publications 
 Froggatt, K., Small, N., Downs, M. (2007) Living and Dying with Dementia – Dialogues about Palliative Care. Oxford, Oxford University Press.
 Small, N., Clark, D., Wright, M., Winslow, M. and Hughes, N. (2005) A Bit of Heaven for the Few? An Oral History of the Hospice Movement. Lancaster, Observatory Press.
 Small, N., Hockey, J. and Katz, J. (2001) Grief, Mourning and Death Ritual. Milton Keynes, Open University Press.

References

External links 
Neil Small talking about his career and research.

 
Living people
Academics of the University of Bradford
Academics of the University of Sheffield
Academics of the University of York
Year of birth missing (living people)